Jim Wakeman may refer to:

Jim Wakeman (Canadian football), in 1973 CFL Draft
Jim Wakeman, character in The Reaping